Robin Lathouwers (born 9 March 2000) is a Dutch professional footballer who plays as a right-back for VVV-Venlo.

Club career
Lathouwers made his professional debut with Jong AZ in a 3–1 Eerste Divisie loss to SC Telstar on 22 December 2019. A few days later, on 24 december 2019, he signed his first professional contract with Jong AZ.

On 9 January 2023, Lathouwers signed a 2.5-year contract with VVV-Venlo.

References

External links
 
 Career stats & Profile - Voetbal International

2000 births
Living people
Footballers from Amsterdam
Dutch footballers
Netherlands youth international footballers
Association football fullbacks
Jong AZ players
VVV-Venlo players
Eerste Divisie players